Sir Allan Herbert Percy Noble, DSO, DSC (1908 – 17 November 1982) was an English naval commander, politician, and diplomat.

Career
Noble was the elder son of Admiral Sir Percy Noble. He joined the Royal Navy in 1926 and was a destroyer commander during World War II, earning a DSO and a DSC. He retired from the Navy in 1946 and entered Parliament as a Conservative Member of Parliament for Chelsea. He was Parliamentary Private Secretary to Anthony Eden from 1947 to 1951. His next appointments included Parliamentary and Financial Secretary to the Admiralty from 1951 to 1955, Parliamentary Under-Secretary of State for Commonwealth Relations from 1955 to 1956 and Minister of State for Foreign Affairs from 1956 to 1959. He was appointed a Privy Counsellor in 1956. In 1961 he became Special Ambassador to the Ivory Coast. He died in 1982.

References
The Noble Family Papers held at Churchill Archives Centre

External links 
 

1908 births
1982 deaths
British diplomats
Companions of the Distinguished Service Order
Conservative Party (UK) MPs for English constituencies
Lords of the Admiralty
Members of the Privy Council of the United Kingdom
Ministers in the Eden government, 1955–1957
Ministers in the Macmillan and Douglas-Home governments, 1957–1964
Ministers in the third Churchill government, 1951–1955
Recipients of the Distinguished Service Cross (United Kingdom)
Royal Navy officers
Royal Navy personnel of World War II
UK MPs 1945–1950
UK MPs 1950–1951
UK MPs 1951–1955
UK MPs 1955–1959